Antiaris toxicaria is a tree in the mulberry and fig family, Moraceae. It is the only species currently recognized in the genus Antiaris. The genus Antiaris was at one time considered to consist of several species, but is now regarded as just one variable species which can be further divided into five subspecies. One significant difference within the species is that the size of the fruit decreases as one travels from Africa to Polynesia. Antiaris has a remarkably wide distribution in tropical regions, occurring in Australia, tropical Asia, tropical Africa, Indonesia, the Philippines, Tonga, and various other tropical islands. Its seeds are spread by various birds and bats, and it is not clear how many of the populations are essentially invasive. The species is of interest as a source of wood, bark cloth, and pharmacological or toxic substances.

Naming and etymology
The generic epithet Antiaris is derived directly from the Javanese name for it: ancar (obsolete Dutch-era spelling: antjar).
Some of the better known synonyms include: Antiaris africana Engl.,  Antiaris macrophylla R.Br.  and Antiaris welwitschii Engl.. 

In English it may be called bark cloth tree, antiaris, false iroko, false mvule or upas tree, and in the Javanese language it is known as the upas or ancar. In the Indonesian language it is known as bemu. In the related official language of the Philippines, Filipino, upas, and in Malaysia's Malaysian language as Ipoh or ancar. In Thai it is the ยางน่อง (yangnong). In Mandinka, it is the jafo and in Wolof the kan or man. In Coastal Kenya, it is called mnguonguo by the Giriama.

The Chinese of Hainan Island, refer to the tree as the "Poison Arrow Tree" ( — "Arrow Poison Wood,") because its latex was smeared on arrowheads in ancient times by the Li people for use in hunting and warfare.

Taxonomy
Currently one species of Antiaris is formally accepted, namely Antiaris toxicaria, with about twenty synonyms recorded and rejected as invalid. The status of other species still is unresolved, namely Antiaris turbinifera. However, given the wide range of the genus, it is quite likely that investigations under way will lead to the establishment of new species. Some varieties and subspecies are already established, pending further investigation. At present the accepted taxonomy is as follows:

Antiaris toxicaria  Lesch. 
Antiaris toxicaria subsp.  africana   (Engl.) C.C.Berg 
Antiaris toxicaria subsp.  humbertii   (Leandri) C.C.Berg 
Antiaris toxicaria subsp.  macrophylla   (R.Br.) C.C.Berg 
Antiaris toxicaria subsp.  madagascariensis   (H.Perrier) C.C.Berg 
Antiaris toxicaria var.  usambarensis   (Engl.) C.C.Berg 
Antiaris toxicaria subsp.  welwitschii   (Engl.) C.C.Berg 
Antiaris turbinifera  Hemsl.  (unresolved)

Characteristics

Antiaris toxicaria is monoecious. It is a large tree, growing to 25–40 m tall, with a trunk up to 40 cm diameter, often buttressed at the base, with pale grey bark. The trees have milky to watery latex. The leaves are elliptic to obovate, 7–19 cm long and 3–6 cm broad.
The African tree bears larger fruit than Asian and Polynesian populations. The Indonesian Antiaris toxicaria flowers in June. In Kenya peak seeding time is March. The edible fruit is a red or purple drupe 2 cm in diameter, with a single seed. The tree grows rapidly and attains maturity within 20 years. It is classified by Hawthorne W.D. as a non-pioneer light demanding tree.

Distribution
The Antiaris tree is found in grassy savanna and coastal plateaus. In Africa, there are three varieties clearly distinguished by habitat and their juvenile forms. One is confined mainly to wooded grassland, the other two are found in wet forests; rainforest, riverine forest and semi-swamp forests.
It generally does not grow at altitudes above some 1500 metres above sea-level.

Uses
Antiaris toxicaria is a fairly small-scale source of timber and yields a lightweight hardwood with density of 250–540 kilogram per cubic metre (similar to balsa). As the wood peels very easily and evenly, it is commonly used for veneer.

The bark has a high concentration of tannins that are used in traditional clothes dyeing and paints.

The seed from the fruit, which is a soft and edible red or purple drupe 2 cm in diameter, is dispersed by birds, bats, possums, monkeys, deer, antelopes and humans.

In Africa and Polynesia the bast fibre is harvested and is used in preparing strong, coarse bark cloth for clothing. The clothes often are decorated with the dye produced from the bark tannins.

Antiaris toxicaria is an excellent, fast-growing shade tree and often is grown around human dwellings for shade. The leaf litter is an excellent compost material and high in nutrients. It often is applied as mulch or green manure in local gardens, which however, must be grown beyond the shade of the extremely dense canopy of the tree.

Recently, the plant had allegedly been used by retired Tanzanian pastor Ambilikile Mwasapile to allegedly cure all manner of diseases, including HIV/AIDS, diabetes, high blood pressure, cancer, asthma, and others.   While found to be harmless to humans when boiled in accordance with Mwasapile's mode of creating a medicinal drink out of the bark, it allegedly was undergoing testing by the WHO and Tanzanian health authorities to verify whether it has any medicinal value.  However, conflicting reports suggest that the plant in question is not in fact Antiaris, but rather Carissa edulis.

Poison

The latex of Antiaris toxicaria contains intensely toxic cardenolides, in particular a cardiac glycoside named antiarin. It is used as a toxin for arrows, darts, and blowdarts in Island Southeast Asian cultures. In various ethnic groups of the Philippines, Borneo, Sulawesi and Malaysia the concentrated sap of Antiaris toxicaria is known as upas, apo, or ipoh, among other names. The concentrate is applied (by dipping) to darts used in sumpit blowguns employed for hunting and warfare. In Javanese tradition in Indonesia, Antiaris toxicaria (also known as upas) is mixed with Strychnos ignatii for arrow poison.

In China, this plant is known as "arrow poison wood" and the poison is said to be so deadly that it has been described as "Seven Up Eight Down Nine Death" meaning that a victim can take no more than seven steps uphill, eight steps downhill or nine steps on level ground before dying. Some travellers' tales have it that the Upas tree is the most poisonous in the world, so that  no one can reach the trunk before falling down dead.

Another account (professedly by one Foersch, who was a surgeon at Semarang in 1773) was published in The London Magazine, December 1783, and popularized by Erasmus Darwin in Loves of the Plants (Botanic Garden, pt. ii). The tree was said to destroy all animal life within a radius of 15 miles or more. The poison was fetched by condemned malefactors, of whom scarcely two out of twenty returned. In fact, the deaths were due to an adjoining extinct volcano near Batar, called Guava Upas. Due to confusion of names, the poisonous effects of the deadly valley have been ascribed to the Upas tree.

Literary allusions to the tree's poisonous nature are frequent and as a rule are not to be taken seriously. A poem that has been frequently commented on and set to music is "The Upas-Tree" by Pushkin.

One of the heroes of Thomas Mann's novel The Magic Mountain written in 1924 mentioned this tree in the context "The knowledge of drugs possessed by the coloured races was far superior to our own. In certain islands east of Dutch New Guinea, youths and maidens prepared a love charm from the bark of a tree—it was probably poisonous, like the manzanilla tree, or the antiaris toxicaria the deadly upas tree of Java, which could poison the air round with its steam and fatally stupefy man and beast".

Literature
 Berg, C.C., 1977. Revisions of African Moraceae (excluding Dorstenia, Ficus, Musanga and Myrianthus). Bulletin du Jardin Botanique National de Belgique, 47: 267–407.
 Bisset, N.G., 1962. Cardiac glycosides: Part VI. Moraceae: The genus Antiaris Lesch. Planta Medica, 10: 143–151.
 Boer, E. & Sosef, M.S.M., 1998. Antiaris Lesch. In: Sosef, M.S.M., Hong, L.T. & Prawirohatmodjo, S. (Editors): Plant Resources of South-East Asia,5(3). Timber trees: Lesser-known timbers. Backhuys Publishers, Leiden, the Netherlands. pp. 73–75.
 Browne, F.G., 1955. Forest trees of Sarawak and Brunei and their products. Government Printing Office, Kuching, Malaysia. pp. 348–349.
 Burkill, I.H., 1966. A dictionary of the economic products of the Malay Peninsula. Revised reprint volume 1 (A-H). Ministry of Agriculture and Cooperatives, Kuala Lumpur, Malaysia. pp. 175–185.
 Council of Scientific and Industrial Research, 1948. The wealth of India: a dictionary of Indian raw materials & industrial products. Volume 1. Publications and Information Directorate, New Delhi, India. pp. 83–84.
 Dolder, F., Tamm, C. & Reichstein, T., 1955. Die Glykoside von Antiaris toxicaria Lesch. Glykoside und Aglycone, 150 [Glycosides of Antiaris toxicaria Lesch. Glycoside and aglycones, 150]. Helvetica Chimica Acta, 38(6): 1364–1396.
 Hano, Y., Mitsui, P. & Nomura, T., 1990. Seven prenylphenols, antiarones C, D, E, F, G, H and I from the root bark of Antiaris toxicaria Lesch. Heterocycles 31(7): 1315–1324.
 Pételot, A., 1954. Les plantes médicinales du Cambodge, du Laos et du Vietnam. [The medicinal plants of Cambodia, Laos and Vietnam]. Vol. 3. Centre National de Recherches Scientifiques et Techniques, Saigon, Vietnam. pp. 126–127.
 Quisumbing, E., 1978. Medicinal plants of the Philippines. Katha Publishing Co., Quezon City, the Philippines. pp. 224–226.

Notes

References
Flora of China: Antiaris toxicaria
Sarawak Forestry information
PubMed: Studies on the Indonesian Antiaris toxicaria sap (abstract)
*Hot and cold soaking treatment of twenty wood species from Irian Jaya,Abdurrohim S and Martawijaya A. Jurnal Penelitian Hasil Hutan Indonesia: 1987. 4(3): 1–9.
*Flora of West Tropical Africa. Hutchinson J and Dalziel JM. Crown Agents for Overseas Governments and Administration: London 1958.  2nd Ed., Vol. 1(2), .
*Analysis of some Malaysian dart poisons, Kopp B, Bauer WP and Bernkop-Schnurch A, Journal of Ethnopharmacology: . 1992. 36(1): 57–62.
*Timber trees: lesser known species Sosef MSM, Hong LT, Prawirohatmodjo S. (eds.) PROSEA 5(3). Backhuys Publishers, Leiden: 1998
*A pocket directory of trees and seeds in Kenya, Teel W. KENGO, Nairobi: 1984
*Studies on the Indonesian Antiaris Toxicaria Sap,  Fujimoto Yukio, Suzuki Yuko, Kanaiwa Takao, Amiya Takashi, Hoshi Katsuji, Fujino Sumiko, "Journal of pharmacobio-dynamics",   6 (2),  The Pharmaceutical Society of Japan: 19830200: pp 128–135

External links

 

Medicinal plants of Africa
Medicinal plants of Asia
Medicinal plants of Oceania
Monotypic Rosales genera
Moraceae
Moraceae genera
Poisonous plants